Norn may refer to:
Norn language, an extinct North Germanic language that was spoken in Northern Isles of Scotland
Norns, beings from Norse mythology
Norn Iron, the local pronunciation of Northern Ireland
Norn iron works, an old industrial community in Sweden where iron ore was excavated
NORN (clothing brand), a clothing brand specialized in winter trouser manufacturing
Norns, a fictional race in Tad Williams' Memory, Sorrow, and Thorn fantasy series
Norns, main species in the Creatures artificial-life simulation series
Norn, a race in the MMORPG Guild Wars
 Norn, a race which has conquered the world, in John Campbell's science fiction series, Cloak of Aesir written at the start of the Golden Age
Mey Norn, Cambodian politician